The 214th Mixed Brigade was a unit of the People's Army of the Republic created during the Spanish Civil War.

History 
It was created on August 24, 1937 in the area of La Solana, under the command of the infantry commander Rafael Trigueros, although the training period didn't end until November. It was integrated into the 66th Division. In turn, the command of the brigade passed to the militia major Francisco del Castillo Sáenz de Tejada.

At the beginning of January 1938, it was sent to the Aragon front to participate in the Battle of Teruel. Once it fell, the 214th Mixed Brigade joined with the rest of the 66th Division in the Francisco Galán Grouping, which had the mission of defending the recently conquered city. It took part in an attack on the position of "El Muletón" and shortly after it was sent to the Alfambra sector. There it was surprised in its positions by the Battle of Alfambra, having to withdraw. It no longer took part in relevant military actions, maintaining its positions in the Rincón de Ademuz area.

During the rest of the war, it did not take part in relevant military actions again.

Command 
 Commanders-in-chief
 Infantry Commander Rafael Trigueros;
 Militia major Francisco del Castillo;
 Militia major Manuel García Fernández

 Commissars
 Joaquín Rodríguez Castro;
 Rafael García Muñoz, of the CNT;

References

Bibliography 
 
 
 
 
 

Military units and formations established in 1937
Military units and formations disestablished in 1939
Mixed Brigades (Spain)
Military units and formations of the Spanish Civil War
Military history of Spain
Armed Forces of the Second Spanish Republic